Walter Fink (16 August 1930 – 13 April 2018) was a German entrepreneur and a patron of contemporary classical music. He is known for being a founding member, executive committee member and sponsor of the Rheingau Musik Festival, where he initiated a series of annual portraits of international composers of contemporary classical music.

Career 
Fink was taught piano from the age of seven. In Frankfurt he took organ lessons with Helmut Walcha and learned conducting with Kurt Thomas. He joined the company of his father in 1930 and expanded it. He was Managing director of the Firmengruppe Fink (FINK Schuhe + Sport GmbH) in Wiesbaden until his retirement in 2002. He founded a church choir at the Christuskirche in Wiesbaden and served there for 25 years as organist.

In 1987 he was one of the founding members of the Rheingau Musik Festival, together with Michael Herrmann, Tatiana von Metternich-Winneburg, Claus Wisser, Michael Bolenius, Hans-Clemens Lucht and Ulrich Rosin. The advertising department of his company designed the logo for the festival. Fink was on the board of the Rheingau Musik Festival Förderverein, an association to support the festival, and was its president during the first years. He was a member the jury of the Rheingau Musik Preis, together with Rolf Beck (Artistic Director of the Schleswig-Holstein Musik Festival), Leo-Karl Gerhartz (retired Music Programme Director of the state broadcaster Hessischer Rundfunk and Peter Hanser-Strecker (Board Chairperson of Schott Music).

Fink received the Cross of the Order of Merit of the Federal Republic of Germany in 2007. He was Grand Officier of the Confrérie de la Chaîne des Rôtisseurs. On 19 October 2011 the Staatliche Hochschule für Gestaltung Karlsruhe granted him an honorary Doctorate of Philosophy.

Engagement for contemporary music 

Fink's interest in contemporary music was instilled in 1947 by Hindemith's opera Mathis der Maler. He supported the Internationale Ferienkurse für Neue Musik in Darmstadt. He was interested in premieres and a personal friend of composers; Wolfgang Rihm served as his best man. Several composers dedicated music to him, such as Volker David Kirchner his piano quartet with clarinet  Exil in 1995 and Toshio Hosokawa Temple Bells Voice from the last movement of his oratorio Voiceless Voice in Hiroshima in 2001.

For the Rheingau Musik Festival he initiated in 1990 the annual Komponistenporträt, the presentation of a living composer and his or her work. Fink was the personal contact to the composers and a sponsor of the concert series, presenting the composers and their music: György Ligeti, Mauricio Kagel, Volker David Kirchner, Wilhelm Killmayer, Wolfgang Rihm, Dieter Schnebel, Aribert Reimann, Helmut Lachenmann, Karlheinz Stockhausen, Hans Werner Henze, Krzysztof Penderecki, Steve Reich, Sofia Gubaidulina, György Kurtág, Arvo Pärt, Henri Dutilleux, Heinz Holliger, Toshio Hosokawa, Rodion Shchedrin, Kaija Saariaho, Hans Zender and Péter Eötvös.

His 80th birthday was celebrated in a concert of the Rheingau Musik Festival at Schloss Johannisberg on 16 August 2010, with compositions of five composers including three premieres, works of Kirchner, Rihm, Hosokawa, Lachenmann and Jörg Widmann for clarinet, percussion, piano and saxophone. Among the works was Lachenmann's Sakura-Variationen. The title of Hosokawa's composition for soprano saxophone and piano, percussion ad libitum, is Für Walter – Arc Song II.

Walter-Fink-Award 
Fink created, in collaboration with the Institut für Musik und Akustik of the ZKM Center for Art and Media Karlsruhe, the Walter-Fink-Award for electroacoustic music, dance and media. Fink sponsored it until 2012.

References

External links 
 
 Sabine Siemon: Eine besondere Herzensangelegenheit / Rheingau Musik Festival – Komponistenwerkstatt zum 80. Geburtstag von Walter Fink freundederkuenste.de 12 August 2010
 Trio Accanto / Helmut Lachenmann 75 Berliner Festspiele
 Personen M.A.K.-Stiftung mak-stiftung.com

1930 births
2018 deaths
German patrons of music
Recipients of the Cross of the Order of Merit of the Federal Republic of Germany
Businesspeople from Hesse
People from Wiesbaden
20th-century philanthropists